The Triumph Bonneville America is a British motorcycle designed and built in Hinckley, Leicestershire by Triumph Motorcycles Ltd.

Development
The saddle was lowered  and the steering head rake angle increased by 4.3 degrees giving a 33.3 degree rake. The America also had a larger fuel tank with a 'chromed' plastic console to house the filler,  diameter speedometer and warning lights. The side panels were extended with sheet-metal covers over the passenger-peg brackets and perforated chrome fittings behind the carburettors to provide the 'retro look' of the air-filter covers from the 1960 Triumph twins. The rider's footrests were also moved to the front of the engine to create a 'cruiser' riding position.

2007
Fuel economy is approximately  city and  highway. The update included new 'reverse cone' chrome silencers, a new design of cast alloy wheels, adjustable clutch and front brake levers and a new all black engine finish with chromed covers. The chrome chain cover, pillion footrest hanger and upper fork shrouds were restyled and a more comfortable pillion seat fitted.

2008
In 2008, the UK version of the Bonneville America was further updated with an electronic fuel injection system to meet the European emission legislation, with the fuel injectors concealed by dummy carburetors.  The US version of the Bonneville America was not updated to EFI until 2009.

See also
List of Triumph motorcycles
Triumph Bonneville

References

External links

 Review of 2003 model

Bonneville America